The Forest of Massimina (Italian: Bosco di Massimina), is the world's most ancient forest. Parco Bosco di Massimina]—

It was created in a former quarry site, that was used for gravel extraction for years, on Via Bartolomeo Chesi south of the Via Aurelia ring road in the Malagrotta area.

Restoration
The habitat restoration and urban reforestation project began in 1998. The area has been completely regraded to create new hills and drainages to recover the original natural topography. It was then covered with a layer of topsoil to support a restored ecological system, using ecocelles taken from the nearby estate of Castel di Guido. 

The plant species were selected to reestablish the natural environment quickly. Around 1500 new trees were planted on the site,  including: 566 Quercus pubescens (downy oak, pubescent oak,), 65 Quercus robur fastigiata (columnar English oak), and 562 oaks of other Quercus species; 196 Acer (maples); 96 Salix (willow);  and several species of shrubs, such as: gorse, privet, myrtle, and cistus.

Recreation
 of pathways go through the forest, including a fitness trail.  The recreation area has benches, picnic tables, and a children's playground.

See also
 
 Environmental restoration
 
 Restoration ecology

References

External links
   YouTube.com: video of Bosco di Massimina
  Repubblica Roma.com: "Malagrotta citizens defend the Woods of Massimina"—
Wordpress: Massimina blog homepage—  

Parks in Rome
Forests of Italy
Metropolitan City of Rome Capital
Rome Q. XII Gianicolense
Ecological restoration
Reforestation
1989 in the environment
1989 establishments in Italy
Protected areas established in 1989